Midsomer Murders is a British television detective drama that has aired on ITV since 1997. The show is based on Caroline Graham's Chief Inspector Barnaby book series, originally adapted by Anthony Horowitz.

From the pilot episode in 1997 until 2 February 2011 the lead character, DCI Tom Barnaby, was portrayed by John Nettles OBE.

In February 2009 it was announced that Nettles had decided to leave Midsomer Murders after the conclusion of series 13 in July 2010. When his last episode "Fit for Murder" aired on 2 February 2011, Nettles had appeared in 81 episodes.

Since 2011 the lead character has been DCI John Barnaby (Neil Dudgeon), who permanently joined the show following John Nettles' 2011 departure. He is the younger cousin of DCI Tom Barnaby. Like his cousin, John Barnaby works for Causton CID. 

Several actors have appeared in a variety of Midsomer Murders episodes: Daniel Casey (DS Gavin Troy, series 1–7, guest star series 11), John Hopkins (DS Daniel Scott, series 7–8), Jane Wymark (Joyce Barnaby, series 1–13), Laura Howard (Cully Barnaby, series 1–3, 6–13), Barry Jackson (Dr George Bullard, series 1–14), Jason Hughes (DS Ben Jones, series 9–15, guest star series 19), Gwilym Lee (DS Charlie Nelson, series 16–18), Kirsty Dillon (WPC Gail Stephens, series 10–13), Fiona Dolman (Sarah Barnaby, series 14-present), Nick Hendrix (DS Jamie Winter, series 19-present), Tamzin Malleson (Dr Kate Wilding, series 14–17), Manjinder Virk (Dr Kam Karimore, series 18–19), and Annette Badland (Dr Fleur Perkins, series 20-present).

As of 29 May 2022, 130 episodes have aired over 22 series.

Series overview

Episodes

Pilot (1997)

Series 1 (1998)

Series 2 (1999)

Series 3 (1999–2000)

Series 4 (2000–2001)

Series 5 (2002)

Series 6 (2003)

Series 7 (2003–2004)

Series 8 (2004–2005)

Series 9 (2005–2006)

Series 10 (2006–2008)

Series 11 (2008–2010)

Series 12 (2009–2010)

Series 13 (2010–2011)

Series 14 (2011–2012)

Series 15 (2012–2013)

Series 16 (2013–2014)

Series 17 (2015)

Series 18 (2016)

Series 19 (2016–2018)

Series 20 (2019–2020)

Series 21 (2020–2021)

Series 22 (2021–2023)

Series 23 (2023)

Series 24 (2024)

References

External links
 Full episode guide at IMDb.com

Midsomer Murders